Nomophila incognita is a moth in the family Crambidae. It was described by Viette in 1959. It is found on Amsterdam Island.

References

Moths described in 1959
Spilomelinae